Live:Cambridge is the seventh album, and the second live album, by Ezio, released in 2004.

Track listing

All songs written by Ezio Lunedei except 59 yards, written by Boo Hewerdine.

"Perfect" – 4:42
"Thin line" – 4:07
"Mermaid song" – 4:48
"The girl of my dreams" – 1:38
"59 yards"  - 5:10
"Braver than you are" – 4:49
"Darkness" – 7:05
"Wild side / Moon" – 9:05
"All for you" – 3:46
"Moonburn" – 6:23
"Thousand years" – 5:08
"Deeper" – 5:45
"Saxon Street" – 17:16

See also
2004 in music

Ezio (band) albums
2004 live albums